Sanjak of Bolu was a sanjak of the Ottoman Empire. In the 1864 Ottoman Empire administrative reorganization, Bolu was created as an independent sanjak, administratively part of the Kastamonu Vilayet.

References

See also
 Bolu Province

History of Bolu Province
Sanjaks of Ottoman Anatolia
Kastamonu vilayet
1864 establishments in the Ottoman Empire
1922 disestablishments in the Ottoman Empire